is a video game released in 1987 for the Family Computer Disk System in Japan. Developed by SEDIC and published by ASCII Corporation, the game was conceived and designed by Toshio Iwai. Natsuki Ozawa endorsed the game.

Gameplay
Otocky can be described as a musical side-scrolling shoot 'em up. The player's spaceship has a ball for a weapon, which can be fired in eight directions; each direction corresponds to a different musical note. The note plays when the player presses the fire button, and is also quantized in time so that it matches the beat playing in the background. By using the weapon selectively the player can improvise music while playing.

The ball is used to destroy enemies by touching them, and also to catch various types of objects:

 Musical Notes which must be collected to finish the level
 Letter 'A's which change the musical instrument sound produced by the ball
 Letter 'B's which provide a secondary weapon

The ball gets smaller when the player is touched by an enemy, until the player loses a life.

Completing a certain number of levels unlocks a music editor which makes it possible for the player to freely compose their own melodies.

Legacy
Otocky is notable for being one of the first games that include creative/procedural generative music, as well as developing the concept of the "musical shoot 'em up".

Otocky is a precursor of Rez, Tetsuya Mizuguchi's 2002 Dreamcast and PlayStation 2 game exploring similar themes of player action and musical evolution. Jake Kazdal, the only North-American member of United Game Artists, has confirmed that while the team did become acquainted with the Disk System game during the process of creating Rez, it has not been much of an influence in fact.

See also
List of Family Computer Disk System games
Sound Fantasy
SimTunes
Electroplankton
Rez

References

External links
HardcoreGaming 101 Otocky Page 

1987 video games
ASCII Corporation games
Famicom Disk System games
Famicom Disk System-only games
Japan-exclusive video games
Music video games
Shoot 'em ups
Video games developed in Japan